Jostle (foaled in 1997 in Kentucky) is an American Thoroughbred racehorse. The daughter of Brocco is probably best remembered for posting a 3-length score in the mile and an eighth Grade II $250,000 Black-Eyed Susan Stakes at Pimlico Race Course on May 19, 2000.

Assessment
In the 2000 International Classification (the forerunner of the World Thoroughbred Racehorse Rankings), Jostle was given a rating of 122, ranking her equal with Spain as the second best three-year-old filly in the world (and the best in America), four pounds below the top-rated French filly Egyptband.

References

1997 racehorse births
Racehorses bred in Kentucky
Racehorses trained in the United States
Thoroughbred family 23